Under the Skies of the Asturias (Spanish: Bajo el cielo de Asturias) is a 1951 Spanish drama film directed by Gonzalo Delgrás and starring Isabel de Castro, Augusto Ordóñez and Luis Pérez de León.

Cast
 Isabel de Castro as Angelina Quirós 
 Augusto Ordóñez as A. Quirós / J. Quirós 
 Luis Pérez de León as Padre Tiburcio 
 José Luis González as Foro 
 Alfonso Estela as G. Manrique  
 Soledad Lence as Carmina  
 Carlos Otero as Federico  
 Ramón Giner as Pepín 
 María Zaldívar as Griselda  
 Vicente Miranda as Pepón  
 Rosario Vallín as Sinfo 
 Luis Villasiul as Fray Ceferino  
 Matías Ferret as Vigil  
 Manuel Santullano as Román 
 Silvia Morgan as Felisa 
 Carlo Tamberlani as Fray Atanasio

References

Bibliography 
 Crusells, Magi. Directores de cine en Cataluña: de la A a la Z. Edicions Universitat Barcelona, 2009.

External links 
 

1951 drama films
Spanish drama films
1951 films
1950s Spanish-language films
Films directed by Gonzalo Delgrás
Spanish black-and-white films
1950s Spanish films